Jet Sul is a business that was founded in 1993 by José Rodrigues Cordeiro.  Initially it offered charter services and currently it continues to operate as a charter airline for the needs of executives and corporations.  All the aircraft are configured with business interiors.
The Company ceased operation 2003.

Fleet
Dassault Falcon 10
IAI Westwind II
Raytheon BeechJet
Embraer EMB 110 Bandeirante
Piper Seneca III
Beechcraft King Air 350

References

Defunct airlines of Brazil
Airlines established in 1993
2003 disestablishments in Brazil